Opfikon (in the local Swiss German dialect) is the name of a municipality in the Swiss canton of Zürich, located in the district of Bülach.

Coat of arms

Blazon: Party per fess gules and argent, in chief a half length portrait of a man wearing a coat sable with a white collar, in base cross pattee sable.

Geography

Opfikon is situated right to the northeast of the city of Zürich in the Glatt Valley, near Zurich Airport, and thus lies within the greater Zürich area. As it belongs to the region known as the Zurichois Lowlands (Zürcher Unterland), the landscape is rather flat. The lowest point lies 420.4 m above sea level at the border to the neighboring commune of Rümlang, the highest one in the Hard forest, 481 m above sea level. 37% of the municipal territory is covered by settlement area, 17% by wood, 27% by farming ground, 17.6% by transport infrastructures and 1.2% by waters.

Historical overview

The present municipality traces back to two settlements, one of which is Opfikon itself, situated right from the river Glatt, whereas on the other side of it lies Oberhusen. Glattbrugg, as its name ("bridge over the Glatt") suggests, originally was not a settlement, but a passage of some importance. However, the name was later also used for a smithy and a mill that were built near the bridge at the left-hand riverbank, and round which eventually developed another settlement.

When the whole political order was changed during the Helvetic Republic (1798–1803), Opfikon became part of the municipality of Kloten, that pertained to the district of Bassersdorf. Oberhusen, lying on the other side of the Glatt, fell to the commune of Seebach belonging to the district of Regensdorf.

After Napoleon's Act of Mediation (19 February 1803) the administration of the canton of Zürich was rearranged again, and Opfikon and Oberhusen were united into a commune named Opfikon, which appertained now to the likewise new-formed district of Bülach. In the course of the Restoration after the end of the Napoleonic era, the commune of Opfikon,  consisting of the two civil communities Opfikon and Oberhusen (with Glattbrugg) established in 1815, became part of the chief district (Oberamt) of Embrach, that in 1831, as a result of the new-established cantonal constitution, changed its capital to Bülach. In 1918 the two civil communities were merged in the already existing political commune of Opfikon.

Due to the growing importance of the former hamlet Glattbrugg, the name Oberhusen is the longer the less used, and the municipality as a whole is now often called Opfikon-Glattbrugg to draw a distinction to Opfikon proper as a part of it.

Demographics
, 41.5% of the population was made up of foreign nationals. Over the last 10 years the population has grown at a rate of 21.1%. Most of the population speaks German  (72.5%), with Italian being second most common ( 5.5%) and Serbo-Croatian being third ( 3.1%).

The age distribution of the population is children and teenagers (0–19 years old) make up 18.6% of the population, while adults (20–64 years old) make up 68.1% and seniors (over 64 years old) make up 13.4%.  In Opfikon about 64.4% of the population (between age 25–64) have completed either non-mandatory upper secondary education or additional higher education (either university or a Fachhochschule).

The historical population is given in the following table:

 in 1634 Oberhausen had 9 households.
Among Christian churches, there is the Arulmihu Sivan Temple located in Glattbrugg.

Politics

The results of the last elections for the municipal parliament (2 April 2006)were as follows: 

The President of the municipality is Walter Fehr (Gemeindeverein ‚Municipal Association’)

In the 2007 National Council elections the most popular party was the SVP which received 48.3% of the vote.  The next three most popular parties were the SPS (15.5%), the FDP (9.9%) and the CVP (9.4%).

Economy

Thanks in part to its favourable location between the city centre and Zurich airport, several large companies have their headquarters in Opfikon. Adecco is one of the world's largest providers of personnel services and at the same time one of the largest employers on the planet. Swissport is the world's largest service company for airlines and airports. Hotelplan is the second-largest Swiss tour operator, and its subsidiary Interhome provides around 50,000 holiday homes and apartments in 31 countries. The Nuance Group operates 400 shops at 60 airports in 20 countries.  Trivadis is an independent IT services company with 700 employees at 14 locations in Switzerland, Germany, Austria and Denmark. VBG Verkehrsbetriebe Glattal AG operates public transport in the Glattal and Furttal regions and in the Effretikon/Volketswil area on behalf of the Zurich Transport Association (ZVV) as the company with market responsibility (MVU). These are joined by Mondelez Europe and Cadillac Europe as well as the Swiss airline Zimex.

Belair Airlines, a subsidiary of Air Berlin, was headquartered in Glattbrugg. In addition Swissport, Germania Flug,  and Zimex Aviation have their head offices in Glattbrugg.

Kraft Foods Europe has its head office in Glattpark, Opfikon. China Airlines, at one point, operated the Switzerland Branch office in Glattbrugg.

Opfikon has an unemployment rate of 4.63%.  , there were 80 people employed in the primary economic sector and about 13 businesses involved in this sector.  1510 people are employed in the secondary sector and there are 121 businesses in this sector.  14456 people are employed in the tertiary sector, with 752 businesses in this sector.

Education
The Schule Opfikon, the communal school, has classes in the Lättenwiesen, Oberhausen, Mettlen and Halden campuses in Glattbrugg. The Musikschule is in Glattbrugg.

Transport

Opfikon is served by Zürich S-Bahn line S7, whilst Glattbrugg is served by S-Bahn lines S9 and S15. Opfikon is an 11-minute ride from Zürich Hauptbahnhof by S-Bahn.

Opfikon is also served by the Stadtbahn Glattal, a light rail system that interworks with the Zürich tram system, with several stops in the municipality. Routes 10 and 12 cross the municipality via Glattbrugg railway station on their journeys from Zurich Airport to, respectively, central Zürich and Stettbach railway station. Route 11 runs along the southern boundary of the municipality on its journey from central Zürich to Auzelg in the neighbouring municipality of Wallisellen.

Etymology

Opfikon is formed with the place name suffix -(i)kon/-(i)ken, that is widely spread in the area of the cantons of Zürich, Argovia and Lucerne and that has been merged from the suffix -ing- ("followers of the mentioned one") and the word hof ("landed estate") in the dative plural form, used as a locative. This origin is yet more obvious at the congenerous place names ending in -(i)kofen, frequent in the cantons of Bern, Solothurn, and also in Thurgovia; place names of this formation are dated to the 7th/8th century. The first part of the name traces back to an anthroponym *Opfo, that, however, as such is not on record and is regarded either as a short form of a name like Otfried or something similar or as a formation from a supposed stem *upp-, forming names in west Germanic, which would have developed to OHG *opf-/upf-.

The oldest ensured evidence of the name (Obtinchofa/Obfinchoven) dates back to 1153; the attribution of an earlier record Ubinchova in a document from the year 744 is doubtful.

Sources

External links

 Official web-site of the town of Opfikon 
 
 Webcam/Live-Weather Opfikon 

 
Cities in Switzerland
Municipalities of the canton of Zürich